Lazar Tasić (Serbian Cyrillic: Лазар Тасић; 5 April 1931 – 16 May 2003) was a Serbian football player.

He played 13 matches for the Yugoslav national team scoring once.

He managed Vefa.

References

External links
 Profile on Serbian federation official site 

1931 births
2003 deaths
Serbian footballers
Yugoslav footballers
Yugoslavia international footballers
Association football midfielders
OFK Beograd players
Red Star Belgrade footballers
Yugoslav First League players
US Boulogne players
Ligue 2 players
1. FC Saarbrücken players
NK Čelik Zenica players
Serbian expatriate footballers
Expatriate footballers in France
Expatriate footballers in Germany
Footballers from Belgrade
Serbian football managers
Yugoslav football managers
Vefa S.K. managers